Yrjö Lampila (23 April 1901 – 18 October 1963) was a Finnish diver. He competed in the men's 10 metre platform event at the 1928 Summer Olympics.

References

External links
 

1901 births
1963 deaths
Finnish male divers
Olympic divers of Finland
Divers at the 1928 Summer Olympics
Divers from Helsinki